Abraham Rodriguez may refer to:

Abraham Rodriguez (novelist), American novelist
Abraham Rodriguez (soccer) (born 2002), American soccer player